Ernan (also Romanized as Ernān; also known as Arnūn and Arnūn-e Bālā) is a village in Ernan Rural District, in the Central District of Mehriz County, Yazd Province, Iran. At the 2006 census, its population was 394, in 115 families.

Demography 
As of the census of 2016, there were 394 people and 115 families residing in the village.

Tourism

National Heritage Site 
Ernan Castle is related to the Qajar Empire and is located in Mehriz City.

References 

Populated places in Mehriz County